The 1919 Centre Praying Colonels football team represented Centre College in the 1919 Southern Intercollegiate Athletic Association football season. The Praying Colonels scored 485 points, leading the nation, while allowing 23 points and finishing their season with a perfect record of 9–0. The team was retroactively selected by Jeff Sagarin as national champion for the 1919 season.

Quarterback Bo McMillin and center James "Red" Weaver were named to Walter Camp's first-team 1919 College Football All-America Team. Just the year before, Georgia's Bum Day had been the first player from the South ever selected to Camp's first team– and Centre thus became the first Southern school with two. Fullback and end James "Red" Roberts was named to Camp's third team.

The highlight of the season was the win over West Virginia. McMillin had the team pray before it, forever giving the Centre College Colonels its alternate moniker of "Praying Colonels."

Before the season
Five Centre regulars were natives of Fort Worth, Texas, namely quarterback Bo McMillin, Bill James, Sully Montgomery, Matty Bell, and Red Weaver. They were accused of being professionals, but the charges were rebuked by season's end. "Without Bo it would not be a Centre team."

Former Centre player and North Side High School head coach Robert L. Myers was to bring McMillin, Weaver,  and the above teammates to Centre. However, McMillin and Weaver  did not have sufficient credits to enter college, and thus entered Somerset High School for the 1916-17 year, playing with Red Roberts.

Centre's linemen were known as the "Seven Mustangs".

Schedule

Season summary

Week 1: Hanover

Sources:

On opening day, Centre swamped , 95–0. Eight different players scored. Roberts was shifted from fullback to tackle, and played well.

The starting lineup was King (left end), Roberts (left tackle), Montgomery (left guard), Bell (center), Van Antwerp (right guard), Coleman (right tackle), Whitnell (right end), McMillin (quarterback), Murphy (left halfback), Davis (right halfback), Diddle (fullback).

Week 2: at Indiana

Sources:

Centre beat Indiana, 12–3. Indiana was up 3–0 with 2:20 left in the game, when Centre started its comeback victory. McMillin and Roberts worked it towards the goal, Roberts going over. Indiana was then desperate to even the score, and McMillin intercepted a pass, and returned it for a touchdown, dodging and straight arming the entire Indiana eleven. Indiana's three points came early in the first period, when its quarterback, Mathys, made a 35-yard drop kick.

The starting lineup was Whitnell (left end), Montgomery (left tackle), Van Antwerp (left guard), Garrett (center), Coleman (right guard), James (right tackle), McCullom (right end), McMillin (quarterback), Bittle (left halfback), Davis (right halfback), Roberts (fullback).

Week 3: St. Xavier
The Colonels beat St. Xavier,  57–0.

Week 4: Transylvania
Transylvania's Milton broken several bones in his foot the week previous.

Week 5: at Virginia

Sources:

Centre's backfield starred and smashed the Virginia Orange and Blue, 49–7 in the mud. Joe Murphy had a 75-yard touchdown run. Soon after, McMillin went 70 yards for a touchdown. Kuyk scored Virginia's points.

The starting lineup was Bell (left end), Montgomery (left tackle), Van Antwerp (left guard), Weaver (center), Cregor (right guard), James (right tackle), Snoddy (right end), McMillin (quarterback), Armstrong (left halfback), Davis (right halfback), Roberts (fullback).

Week 6: at West Virginia

Sources:

The sixth week of play brought the highlight of the season — a 14–6 comeback win over West Virginia and the nation's leading scorer Ira Rodgers. McMillin had the team pray before the game, forever giving the Centre College Colonels its alternate moniker of "Praying Colonels."

Rodgers came out passing and West Virginia scores first early when he bucked it over.  Later, a 25-yard pass from McMillin to Terry Snoddy brought the ball near the goal. Roberts eventually scored. Centre had another touchdown drive in the last quarter, ending in McMillin sidestepping for a touchdown. Murphy was in a flimsy track suit and track shoes.

The starting lineup was Bell (left end), Montgomery (left tackle), Van Antwerp (left guard), Weaver (center), Cregor (right guard), Jones (right tackle), Snoddy (right end), McMillin (quarterback), Davis (left halfback), Armstrong (right halfback), Roberts (fullback).

Week 7: Kentucky
With a large crowd at home on Cheek Field, the Colonels beat rival Kentucky, 56–0, giving the Wildcats their worst loss on the season. Roberts had three touchdowns.

The starting lineup was Bell (left end), Montgomery (left tackle), Van Antwerp (left guard), Weaver (center), Cregor (right guard), James (right tackle), Snoddy (right end), McMillin (quarterback), Davis (left halfback), Armstrong (right halfback), Roberts (fullback).

Week 8: vs. DePauw

Sources:

McMillin's passes "aroused the wonderment of the crowd." The first touchdown came on an 18-yard pass to Army Armstrong.

The starting lineup was Bell (left end), Montgomery (left tackle), Van Antwerp (left guard), Weaver (center), Cregor (right guard), James (right tackle), Snoddy (right end), McMillin (quarterback), Armstrong (left halfback), Davis (right halfback), Roberts (fullback).

Week 9: at Georgetown

Sources:

Georgetown's one score came off a 65-yard fumble return. Weaver made 11  straight extra points.

The starting lineup was Bell (left end), Montgomery (left tackle), Van Antwerp (left guard), Weaver (center), Cregor (right guard), James (right tackle), Snoddy (right end), McMillin (quarterback), Davis (left halfback), Armstrong (right halfback), Roberts (fullback).

Postseason

Legacy

Red Weaver made 47 out of 48 extra points with 46 in a row, and held the NCAA record with 99 consecutive points after touchdowns in the 1919 and 1920 seasons.  Weaver was put at the placekicker position on an Associated Press Southeast Area All-Time football team 1869-1919 era.

The season brought national attention to the small town of Danville.

Awards and honors
Due to the dispute over professionalism, most writers picked Auburn as SIAA champion. The team was retroactively selected by Jeff Sagarin as the national champion for the 1919 season.

McMillin and Weaver were named to Walter Camp's first-team 1919 College Football All-America Team. Just the year before Bum Day was the first Southern player ever selected to Camp's first team – and Centre became the first school with two. Fullback and end Red Roberts was named to Camp's third team.

Players

Depth chart
The following chart provides a visual depiction of Centre's lineup during the 1919 season with games started at the position reflected in parenthesis. The chart mimics a single wing on offense.

Starters

Line

Backfield

Subs

Line

Backfield

Scoring leaders

The following is an incomplete list of statistics and scores, largely dependent on newspaper summaries.

See also
 1919 College Football All-Southern Team

References

Centre
Centre Colonels football seasons
College football national champions
College football undefeated seasons
Centre Praying Colonels football